Colin Kurz is a Canadian curler from Winnipeg, Manitoba. He currently plays third for the J. T. Ryan rink.
He played as skip for the Canadian mixed curling team at the 2019 World Mixed Curling Championship, where his team won the gold medal.

Teams

Men's

Mixed

Personal life
He attended the University of Manitoba.

References

External links

Living people
Canadian male curlers
Curlers from Winnipeg
World mixed curling champions
Canadian mixed curling champions
University of Manitoba alumni
Year of birth missing (living people)